The Utah State–Wyoming football rivalry is an American college football rivalry between the Utah State Aggies and the Wyoming Cowboys. The rivalry is one of the oldest for both schools; it is Utah State's fourth-oldest rivalry and Wyoming's fifth. The schools played for the first time in 1903, a  Aggie victory and Utah State leads the series 

On November 25, 2013, "Bridger’s Battle" was announced as the name for the rivalry, after American frontiersman   who spent much of his career in the region. A .50 caliber Rocky Mountain Hawken rifle was announced as the trophy for the rivalry, widely considered to be what Bridger carried.

Meetings
Utah State and Wyoming have a storied history dating back to the early 1900s as both schools were members of the Rocky Mountain Athletic Conference (RMAC) from 1916–37 and later members of the Mountain States Conference from 1938–61. Following the dissolution of the Mountain States Conference in 1962, Utah State and Wyoming continued to play almost every year until 1978, then did not play again until 2001. They would meet only four additional times from 2003 to 2011.

Utah State joined the Mountain West Conference in 2013 and was placed in the same division as Wyoming; the rivalry was renewed and is again played on an annual basis. The 2020 matchup, scheduled to be played in Laramie, was cancelled due to a spike in cases of COVID-19 within the Utah State program amid the ongoing pandemic.

Game results

See also  
 List of NCAA college football rivalry games

References

College football rivalries in the United States
Utah State Aggies football
Wyoming Cowboys football